USS Navarro (APA/LPA-215) was a  of the US Navy. She was of the VC2-S-AP5 Victory ship design type that saw service in World War II and the Vietnam War.
Navarro was named after Navarro County, Texas.

Construction
She was laid down 27 June 1944, under Maritime Commission (MARCOM) contract, MCV hull 563, by Permanente Metals Corporation, Yard No. 2, Richmond, California; launched on 3 October 1944; sponsored by Mrs. Anne Jones; and commissioned 15 November.

Service history

World War II
After commissioning, Navarro moved to the Naval Supply Depot, San Francisco to take on stores. Then, in a series of moves about San Francisco Bay, the ship took on ammunition and degaussed. She commenced shakedown 1 December, with a twelve-day cruise to San Pedro, and 16 December, she commenced a week of amphibious training at San Diego.

Navarro got underway New Year's Day 1945 for Seattle, Washington, to embark troops and equipment for transport to the South Pacific. She departed Seattle 12 January, called at the Hawaiian Islands 20 January, reached Guadalcanal 10 February, where she offloaded cargo and troops, and then moved to Sunlight Channel, Russell Islands. At the Russells, Navarro participated in an intensive rehearsal for the invasion of Okinawa.

Invasion of Okinawa

Navarro arrived off Okinawa Easter Sunday 1945, the morning that US Forces invaded the island. The next two days were spent offloading troops and cargo, accomplished in record time. So effective was screening and air cover that, despite several air alerts, Navarros gunners fired on hostile air contacts but three times.

Transport duties
After six days in the area, Navarro steamed for Guam. The morning of 12 April, she departed for the United States, via Pearl Harbor, arriving San Francisco 30 May; then transported troops and equipment to Seattle. She departed Seattle 21 June, for Ulithi via Eniwetok, but continued on to Okinawa where she commenced offloading 24 July, amidst frequent calls to General Quarters. Navarro then steamed to Ulithi, and was anchored in that lagoon when the Japanese surrendered.

She had been scheduled to return to the United States, but was hurriedly rerouted to the Philippines and arrived Leyte 23 August. A few days later she steamed for Yokohama, carrying occupation troops for the Yokohama district. Navarro next participated in Operation Magic Carpet, returning American troops home.

Decommissioning
She decommissioned 15 March 1946, entered the Pacific Reserve Fleet at Stockton, California, where she remained until the Korean War generated the requirement for a rapid expansion of forces.

Second commission
Recommissioned 2 December 1950, Navarro transited the Panama Canal to join the Amphibious Force, Atlantic Fleet. During the next four years she operated out of Norfolk, Virginia, participating in both Mediterranean and Caribbean deployments.

She returned to the US Pacific Fleet in 1955, and made periodic deployments to the Western Pacific. Her 1956 WESTPAC cruise was marked by amphibious demonstrations held for the Korean Marines and Midshipmen at Chinhae, Korea.

During the summer of 1958, Navarro provided services for a series of atomic tests at Eniwetok. In 1960, she landed 1,200 Marines on Formosan beaches while participating in a mock amphibious invasion.

Laotian crisis
The Laotian situation entailed changes of embarkation plans for the 1st Battalion, 4th Marines, while Navarro was in Hawaii. Originally intended for a practice assault on California beaches, the Marines were instead carried under sealed orders to Okinawa.

After participating in large scale amphibious demonstrations for the president in January 1962, Navarro deployed to the Western Pacific 22 January, for a seven-month tour with the 7th Fleet. When a further deterioration of the Laotian situation seemed imminent, the president ordered a task force to move toward Indochina 12 May. Navarro carried a portion of the 1,800 embarked Marines of this force.

When aircraft carrier , Navarro, and dock landing ship  arrived in the Gulf of Siam, they were directed to off-load their 1,800-man Battalion Landing Team by helicopter from the Gulf to Bangkok, Thailand. This force bolstered the Thai defense against possible attack by Laotian communists.

Navarro departed Okinawa 11 August and arrived Long Beach 25 August for upkeep and operational readiness training.

The ship's boats were used for the re-creation of the Normandy landings of 6 June 1944, in the 1964 film The Americanization of Emily, starring James Garner and Julie Andrews. This is a minor anachronism to the film, as the Navarro was laid down after D-Day.

Modernization overhaul
Upon return from her 1964 Western Pacific deployment, Navarro underwent a Fleet Rehabilitation and Modernization overhaul at Pacific Ship Repair Shipyard, San Francisco. Upon completion, she participated in Exercise "Silver Lance" 25 February-9 March 1965, off the southern California coast, and 27 April, she departed on another WESTPAC deployment.

Vietnam War
From 27 January through 16 February 1966, Navarro formed part of a special task unit which provided boating and support for the combat landing of 1,200 Marines in Southern Quang Ngai Province, Republic of Vietnam, in Operation Double Eagle. Over a dozen ships and 5,000 Marines and Sailors combined to mark "Double Eagle" as the largest amphibious operation up to that time since the Korean War.

Unit commendation
Navarro returned to Long Beach, California on 16 March, after 10 months and 27 days as part of the Amphibious Assault Forces of the 7th Fleet operating off Vietnam. For service in support of military operations in Vietnam during the period 1 January through 23 March 1968, Navarro received the Secretary of the Navy, Meritorious Unit Commendation. She rescued 43 seamen from the stranded British merchant ship  when it grounded on a reef in the South China Sea during typhoon Emma. In November 1967, Navarros salvage efforts contributed directly to the salvage of landing ship-tank , damaged and stranded on the coast of Vietnam. Navarros officers and men carried out this salvage operation within range of enemy small arms and artillery.

Final decommission
Navarro continued to maintain a high state of readiness and provided amphibious expertise through both her west coast training operations and her deployments to the Western Pacific. Reclassified an amphibious transport, LPA-215, on 1 January 1969, she was decommissioned at San Diego.

On 20 August 1970, she was transferred to the Maritime Administration (MARAD) and placed in the National Defense Reserve Fleet, Suisun Bay Group, Benicia, California. She was permanently transferred to MARAD on 1 September 1971 and stricken on 1 December 1976, from the Naval Vessel Register.

On 19 February 1982, she was exchanged to Farrell Lines, Inc., who immediately sold her to C.W. Enterprise Investments, Inc., with the provision that she be scrapped within 24 months in either South Korea or Taiwan. She was withdrawn from the fleet 16 June 1982.

Awards
Navarro received one battle star for World War II service, and four campaign stars and a unit commendation for service in the Vietnam War.

Notes 

Citations

Bibliography 

Online resources

External links

Haskell-class attack transports
Navarro County, Texas
World War II amphibious warfare vessels of the United States
Troop ships
Ships built in Richmond, California
1944 ships
Pacific Reserve Fleet, Stockton Group
Suisun Bay Reserve Fleet